Queen Victoria maintained diaries and journals throughout her life, filling 122 volumes which were expurgated after her death by her daughter Princess Beatrice. Extracts were published during her life and sold well. The collection is stored in the Royal Archives and, in 2012, was put online in partnership with the Bodleian Libraries.

Creation
Victoria started a daily journal in 1832, when she was just thirteen years old, and her first words were, "This book, Mamma gave me, that I might write the journal of my journey to Wales in it." The keeping of such journals was common at that time. She was instructed in this by her governess, Lehzen, and her mother inspected the journals each day until she became Queen.

She continued writing until just ten days before her death, 69 years later, filling 122 volumes. She also wrote many letters and, with the journals, it is estimated that she wrote over two thousand words a day — about sixty million words during her lifetime.

Publication
Extracts of her journals were published during her lifetime such as Leaves from the Journal of Our Life in the Highlands which was published in 1868.  The first edition sold twenty thousand copies, which was a great success. Further editions were printed and a sequel was published — More Leaves from the Journal of Our Life in the Highlands.  Extracts of her journals also appeared in the Theodore Martin's biography of Prince Albert — The Life of His Royal Highness the Prince Consort — which was published in five volumes from 1875 to 1880.

Expurgation
Victoria's daughter, Princess Beatrice, was her literary executor.  She went through all the journals and, as instructed by the Queen, removed anything which might upset the royal family.  The expurgated version created by Beatrice filled 111 hand-written volumes.  Most of the originals from 1840 onwards were then destroyed, despite opposition from Victoria's grandson King George V and his wife, Queen Mary. The nature of Beatrice's editing can be judged by comparison with the typescript copies which were made earlier by Lord Esher for his book, The Girlhood of Queen Victoria. These cover the period from 1832 to 1840; for instance, on 13 February 1840, Victoria recorded her delight at Albert putting on her stockings and then watching him shave.  This incident does not appear in Beatrice's copy:

Archive

The journals are stored in the Royal Archives in Windsor Castle.  In 2012, they were scanned and made available online as a special project for the diamond jubilee of Victoria's great-great-granddaughter Queen Elizabeth II. Although initially made available for free worldwide, since mid-2013 free access to the diaries has been restricted to users within the United Kingdom only.

Citations

Sources

External links
 Queen Victoria's Journals — online site maintained by the Bodleian Libraries and the Royal Archives which is freely available to readers in the United Kingdom.  Global readers were able to access the site freely until the end of June 2013.
 Royal Archives — official website of the British monarchy.
 Extracts from Victoria's diaries

Diaries
Queen Victoria